William Isangura (born 25 July 1952) is a Tanzanian boxer. He competed at the 1980 Summer Olympics and the 1984 Summer Olympics. At the 1980 Summer Olympics, he lost to Grzegorz Skrzecz of Poland.

References

1952 births
Living people
Tanzanian male boxers
Olympic boxers of Tanzania
Boxers at the 1980 Summer Olympics
Boxers at the 1984 Summer Olympics
Boxers at the 1982 Commonwealth Games
Commonwealth Games bronze medallists for Tanzania
Commonwealth Games medallists in boxing
Place of birth missing (living people)
Heavyweight boxers
Medallists at the 1982 Commonwealth Games